Spain will compete at the 2017 World Championships in Athletics in London, United Kingdom, 4–13 August 2017.

Results

Men
Track & road events

Field events

Combined events – Decathlon

Women
Track & road events

Field events

Key
Note–Ranks given for track events are within the athlete's heat only
Q = Qualified for the next round
q = Qualified for the next round as a fastest loser or, in field events, by position without achieving the qualifying target
NR = National record
N/A = Round not applicable for the event
Bye = Athlete not required to compete in round

External links
 

Nations at the 2017 World Championships in Athletics
World Championships in Athletics
Spain at the World Championships in Athletics